William Henry Morris (28 September 1920 – March 1994) was a Welsh professional footballer who played as an outside left in the Football League for Swansea Town and Brighton & Hove Albion.

Life and career
Morris was born in 1920 in Swansea. He represented his country at schoolboy level, and turned professional with Swansea Town in May 1946. He was already 27 years old when he made his Football League debut in January 1948, and contributed to Swansea's Third Division South title the following season. He moved on to another Southern Section club, Brighton & Hove Albion, in September 1949. He scored 4 goals from 31 appearances before returning to Wales where he played for Llanelli. Morris settled in Swansea, where he died in March 1994 at the age of 73.

References

1920 births
1994 deaths
Footballers from Swansea
Welsh footballers
Wales schools international footballers
Association football wingers
Swansea City A.F.C. players
Brighton & Hove Albion F.C. players
Llanelli Town A.F.C. players
English Football League players